Tyrus is a 2015 feature-length documentary directed by Pamela Tom about the renowned Chinese American artist Tyrus Wong,  whose paintings became the inspiration for the classic animated feature Bambi.

Synopsis

Tyrus Wong immigrates to the U.S. from Guangzhou as a boy.  Though living in poverty, his father, encourages Wong's unique talent for drawing.  Inspired by the art of the Song Dynasty and abstract Western painters like Picasso and Whistler, Wong employed simple brushstrokes, using watercolors and pastels, to create lush forests and green meadows.  His philosophy of abstraction (fewer strokes) allowed him to connect with viewers' imaginations, as his work would suggest images while viewers' minds would fill in the rest.  His work eventually caught the eye of Walt Disney, who hired Wong as an illustrator at Walt Disney Studios.  Wong's style became the blueprint for the visual look and feel of the film of Bambi, constituting all its background art.  After an abrupt dismissal from Disney, Wong would go on to become a fine artist, a storyboard artist, and muralist as a means of providing for providing for his family; however, he became a kite designer to fulfill himself artistically.  Wong's storyboards helped set the tone and drama for films such as Sands of Iwo Jima (1949), Rebel Without a Cause (1955), William Goldman's Harper (1966) and Sam Peckinpah's The Wild Bunch. Despite working as in Hollywood for nearly 30 years, the racist attitudes of the time prevented his contributions from being acknowledged until the 21st century.  Wong died at the age of 106 on December 30, 2016, the oldest-known living Chinese American artist at the time of his death.  He is now widely regarded, at Disney Studios and among illustrator communities, as "a Legend."

Production

Pamela Tom was inspired to make Tyrus after watching Bambi with her daughter.  In the behind-the-scenes documentary that followed, she learned of Wong:

Tyrus was produced by Tom, Tamara Khalaf, and Gwen Wynne, the originator of the EOS World Fund.

Release

Tyrus premiered on September 8, 2015 at the Telluride Film Festival.  It had its U.S. national release on September 8, 2017 as a part of PBS's long-running series, American Masters.  The film has screened at numerous film festivals across the world.

Critical Reception

Good Docs labeled the film a "tour-de-force."

Awards

References

External links
Tyrus on IMDb
 CAAM Fest 2016

2015 films
Films about Chinese Americans
American independent films
Documentary films about painters
Documentary films about Asian Americans
Documentary films about the film industry
2010s English-language films
2010s American films